Ahmad Khatami (born 1956 in Shahr-e Ray, Tehran Province, Iran) is a professor of Persian language and literature, a lecturer at the Department of Persian Language and Literature, and the head of the Center of Excellence of Persian Literary History at Shahid Beheshti University in Iran.

References

External links
 http://lah.sbu.ac.ir/Desktopmodules/Sbu_ProfessorsPage/SP.aspx?userid=470
 http://www.iup.ir/index.aspx?pid=95431
 https://web.archive.org/web/20111024035543/http://plfl.azad.ac.ir/index.aspx?siteid=30
 https://web.archive.org/web/20121031064854/http://www.ihss.ac.ir/shownews.aspx?newsid=1079
 http://www.aryanews.com/lct/fa-ir/News/20110511/20110511192536593.htm
 http://www.rasekhoon.net/Mashahir/Show-111695.aspx
 http://www.honar.ac.ir/Publisher/lett_news/show.asp?id=269
 https://web.archive.org/web/20120422032241/http://www.honar.ac.ir/Publisher/Books/isfahan_/bazgasht%26sabkeh_india.htm
 http://www.irna.ir/News/30716706/parseek/parseek
 https://archive.today/20130111182438/http://www.president.ir/fa/33052/preview?term=%D9%BE%DA%98%D9%88%D9%87%D8%B4

Academic staff of Shahid Beheshti University
People from Ray, Iran
Living people
1956 births
Faculty of Letters and Humanities of the University of Tehran alumni